Dholpur House is the former residence of the Rana of Dholpur in Delhi. It is located next to India Gate on Shahjahan Road.

It was constructed in the 1920s in the Art Deco style. The walls on the exterior are painted in white.

Today the Union Public Service Commission is housed here. The interviews for recruiting candidates to the All India Services and Group A services for Government of India are conducted here.

References

External links
 

Government buildings in Delhi
Royal residences in Delhi
Art Deco